National Vanguard may refer to:

National Vanguard (American organization), a neo-Nazi organization founded in 2005
National Vanguard (publication), a former American White Nationalist magazine
National Vanguard (Italy), at least two neo-fascist groups of the 1960s and 1970s